Canavery may refer to:
 Ángel Canavery (1850–1916), Argentine Lieutenant Colonel during the Conquest of the Desert campaign
 Saturnino Canavery (1854–1939), Argentine Lieutenant Colonel during the Conquest of the Desert campaign
 Zoilo Canavery (1893–1966), Uruguay-born Argentine amateur football player

See also

 Canaveri (disambiguation)
 Canaverys (disambiguation)